Lázaro Chacón González (27 June 1873 – 9 April 1931) was the acting President of Guatemala from 26 September 1926 to 18 December 1926 and President of Guatemala from 19 December 1926 to 2 January 1931.

Born in Teculután, Zacapa he was the son of Juan José Chacón Paiz and Soledad González Paiz who died during his birth. He is grandson of José Deciderio Chacón and María del Rosario Paiz, and also grandson of Vicente González Chacón and Josefa Paiz Cordón.

Chacón's aunt, Cleta Chacón became his adopted mother. He married Josefina Pazos.

Interim President 

On 25 May 1926, El Imparcial -a private newspaper- had published a news flash: Martial law enacted which referred to executive decree 916, in which President Orellana had suspended the individual guarantees contained in the Constitution; the main reason for such decision was that "insidious and unpatriotic activities of certain elements" tended "to disrupt the peace and development of the country", which, at once, made it impossible to solve the national economic problem. Although El Imparcial was not circulating regularly in the previous days -due to a government boycott-, after May 26 it ceased publication indefinitely. Thereafter, only the official news outlets, such as Diario de Centro América and El Guatemalteco,  could circulate, carrying irrelevant information. The story took a sudden turn on Sunday September 26, when, at 0:15 pm, Orellana died during a vacation trip to Antigua Guatemala; he was in a room at Hotel Manchén. "A violent angina attack ended the life of our illustrious president," explained Diario de Centro America in a special edition that day. These strange circumstances led to the suspicion that he was poisoned. General Lázaro Chacón assumed as interim President and immediately lifted Martial Law and allowed private newspaper to be published again.

Presidency

Chacón was first appointed to the position of Chairman and interim president following the death of General José María Orellana.  He then called for elections in which his main opponent was general Jorge Ubico. Chacón defeated Ubico thanks in part to the strong campaign that journalist Clemente Marroquín Rojas made against the latter in his column called Desnudando al ídolo. Chacón government took some liberties such as creating the National Mortgage Bank (Crédito Hipotecario Nacional) as well as constructing the Faculty of Medicine building for the Faculty of Natural Sciences. During his tenure the Legislative Palace and the national railroad were also completed. During his presidency, the Guatemalan currency was stabilized, but Guatemala suffered the effects of the Great Depression in 1929.

Stroke and resignation 

In December, 1930 the following events occurred in a rapid succession:
 On 12 December, General Chacón suffers a stroke that forces him to resign.
 General Mauro de León, first designated successor to the Presidency apparently resigns.
 Lawyer and cabinet member Baudilio Palma, second designated successor, is appointed interim President.
 On 17 December 1930 a coup d'etat led by general Manuel María Orellana Contreras forces Palma to resign after a short battle inside the Presidential Palace. During the fight, that lasted no more than an hour, both Palma and Mauro de León died. The Liberal Progresista party places general Roderico Anzueto in the key position of Chief of Police.
 On 2 January 1931 José María Reina Andrade is appointed interim President, after the foreign nations representatives refuse to deal with Orellana Contreras and calls for presidential elections.
 On 7 February 1931, general Jorge Ubico Castañeda wins the elections and is sworn as President. The Liberal Party joined with the Progressives to nominate Ubico as Andrade's successor, and although he was the only candidate on the ballot, he received 305,841 votes on February, 1931.  In his inaugural address, he pledged a "march toward civilization".  Once in office, he began a campaign of efficiency that included assuming dictatorial power.

Death 

Chacón died in New Orleans, Louisiana, United States on 9 April 1931 at age 57 as a consequence of his stroke.

Additional information 

His granddaughter Josefina Chacon de Machado was a magistrate and President of the Guatemalan Supreme Court.

His grandson Carlos Gilberto Chacon Torrebiarte was also magistrate and President of the Guatemalan Supreme Court.

Notes and references

Notes

References

Bibliography 

 
 
 
  
 
 
 
 
 
 
 
 

Presidents of Guatemala
Vice presidents of Guatemala
1873 births
1931 deaths
Guatemalan generals
People from Zacapa Department
20th-century Guatemalan people